Qeshlaq-e Tarazlu (also Romanized as Qeshlāq-e Ţarazlū and Qeshlāq-e Tarazlū; also known as Qeshlāq-e Bājīk and Qeshlāq-e Ţarzīlū) is a village in Rowzeh Chay Rural District, in the Central District of Urmia County, West Azerbaijan Province, Iran. As of 2006 census, its population was 353, in 77 families.

References 

Populated places in Urmia County